Edward Nowill Wilton (1872-1966) was an Australian Anglican bishop who served as Assistant Bishop of Melanesia from 1928 to 1929.

Wilton was born in Richmond, Victoria on 11 May 1872. He was educated at Trinity College, Melbourne and St Paul's College, University of Sydney. He was ordained deacon in 1901 and priest in 1902. He served as curate of St John Camden, NSW from 1902 to 1905; and as Rector of Mulgoa, NSW from 1905 to 1907. Wilton was Precentor of St Andrew's Cathedral, Sydney from 1907 to 1916;  and a Canon Residentiary at All Saints' Cathedral, Bathurst from 1907 until his appointment as  bishop.

References

1872 births
People from Richmond, Victoria
1966 deaths
Anglican assistant bishops of Melanesia
University of Sydney alumni
People educated at Trinity College (University of Melbourne)
20th-century Anglican bishops in Oceania